The following towns, suburbs, and neighborhoods comprise the area formally (and collectively) known as Greater Ipoh, Malaysia.

(Source: Ipoh City Hall )

 Ampang
 Anjung Tawas
 Bandar Seri Botani
 Bercham
 Buntong
 Canning Garden 
 Chemor 
 Cyber City
 Falim
 Greentown
 Gugusan Manjoi
 Gunung Lang
 Gunung Rapat
 Ipoh Garden 
 Jelapang
 Keledang
 Klebang
 Lahat
 Meru Raya
 Menglembu
 Pasir Puteh 
 Pasir Pinji
 Pekan Baru
 Pekan Lama (Old Town)
 Pengkalan 
 Silibin 
 Kampung Simee 
 Simpang Pulai 
 Station 18
 Sunway City
 Kampung Sungai Rokam 
 Tambun 
 Taman Cempaka
 Taman Ipoh Jaya
 Tanjung Rambutan
 Tasek
 Ulu Kinta

References

Populated places in Perak
Ipoh
Ipoh